Deutsche Schule Kiew (DSK; Німецька школа в Києві "Nimetska shkola v Kiyevi") is a German international school in Kyiv, Ukraine. It serves grundschule and gymnasium.

See also
 History of Germans in Russia, Ukraine and the Soviet Union

References

External links

 Deutsche Schule Kiew
 Deutsche Schule Kiew 

International schools in Ukraine
Schools in Kyiv
Kiev